Klaudia Jans-Ignacik (née Jans; born 24 September 1984) is a retired Polish tennis player. On 16 August 2004, she reached her best singles ranking of world No. 410. On 10 September 2012, she peaked at No. 28 in the doubles rankings.

Jans-Ignacik won three WTA doubles tournaments, 2009 Andalucia Tennis Experience with Alicja Rosolska, 2012 Internationaux de Strasbourg with Olga Govortsova, and 2012 Rogers Cup with Kristina Mladenovic.

In 2012, she advanced to her first Grand Slam final at the French Open, with Santiago Gonzalez in the mixed-doubles tournament. Jans-Ignacik is one of nine Polish tennis players in history who played in a Grand Slam final, others being Jadwiga Jędrzejowska, Wojciech Fibak, Mariusz Fyrstenberg, Łukasz Kubot, Marcin Matkowski, Agnieszka Radwańska, Alicja Rosolska and Iga Świątek.

She represented Poland in the Fed Cup and both the 2008 and 2012 Summer Olympics. Playing for Poland at the Fed Cup, Jans-Ignacik has a win–loss record of 20–12.

Klaudia married Bartosz Ignacik in 2011 and added his surname to her own. On 31 December 2012, Jans-Ignacik announced that she was pregnant with her first child and would miss the entire 2013 WTA Tour. On 1 August 2013, she gave birth to her first daughter Aniela Ignacik.

In 2014, she returned to professional competitions and reached six doubles semifinals, one of them in her home country, at the Katowice Open.

In January 2015, Jans-Ignacik advanced to her first women's doubles Grand Slam quarterfinal, with Andreja Klepač, at the Australian Open. They lost in straight sets to Chan Yung-jan and Zheng Jie.

On 1 September 2016, Jans-Ignacik announced her retirement from professional tennis.

Significant finals

Grand Slam tournaments

Mixed doubles: 1 runner-up

Premier Mandatory/Premier 5 finals

Doubles: 1 title

WTA career finals

Doubles: 10 (3 titles, 7 runner-ups)

WTA 125 series finals

Doubles: 1 runner-up

ITF finals

Singles (1–1)

Doubles (11–8)

Doubles performance timeline

References

External links

 
 
 

1984 births
Living people
Sportspeople from Gdynia
Polish female tennis players
Tennis players at the 2008 Summer Olympics
Tennis players at the 2012 Summer Olympics
Tennis players at the 2016 Summer Olympics
Olympic tennis players of Poland
Universiade medalists in tennis
Universiade silver medalists for Poland
20th-century Polish women
21st-century Polish women